Narrow Neck is a suburb located on the North Shore of Auckland, New Zealand. It is under the local governance of the Auckland Council.

Until the mid-19th century, Devonport was connected with the rest of the North Shore by a causeway between Ngataringa Bay and the Hauraki Gulf.  This causeway gave the appearance of a "narrow neck". On the eastern side of this strip of land is the Narrow Neck beach, on the western side there was an extensive mangrove swamp.

In the late 19th century the majority of this mangrove swamp was drained and filled in creating land used as a racecourse until the 1930s and subsequently a golf course. In the World Wars the area was used for a military training camp. From 1927 until the mid-1930s a Royal New Zealand Navy ammunition storage facility was located in the suburb; the munitions were moved to the Kauri Point Armament Depot from 1937.

Close to the western edge of the reclaimed area a new road was put through creating a more direct link between Devonport and Takapuna.

Demographics

Narrow Neck had a population of 4,098 at the 2018 New Zealand census, an increase of 114 people (2.9%) since the 2013 census, and an increase of 246 people (6.4%) since the 2006 census. There were 1,428 households, comprising 1,956 males and 2,142 females, giving a sex ratio of 0.91 males per female. The median age was 40.8 years (compared with 37.4 years nationally), with 858 people (20.9%) aged under 15 years, 705 (17.2%) aged 15 to 29, 1,935 (47.2%) aged 30 to 64, and 600 (14.6%) aged 65 or older.

Ethnicities were 86.5% European/Pākehā, 6.6% Māori, 1.8% Pacific peoples, 9.9% Asian, and 3.1% other ethnicities. People may identify with more than one ethnicity.

The percentage of people born overseas was 33.3, compared with 27.1% nationally.

Although some people chose not to answer the census's question about religious affiliation, 59.8% had no religion, 29.6% were Christian, 0.4% had Māori religious beliefs, 0.8% were Hindu, 0.7% were Muslim, 1.2% were Buddhist and 1.9% had other religions.

Of those at least 15 years old, 1,347 (41.6%) people had a bachelor's or higher degree, and 249 (7.7%) people had no formal qualifications. The median income was $43,300, compared with $31,800 nationally. 1,005 people (31.0%) earned over $70,000 compared to 17.2% nationally. The employment status of those at least 15 was that 1,629 (50.3%) people were employed full-time, 558 (17.2%) were part-time, and 75 (2.3%) were unemployed.

References

External links
Soldiers from Narrow Neck marching through Auckland, World War II
Photographs of Narrow Neck held in Auckland Libraries' heritage collections.

Suburbs of Auckland
North Shore, New Zealand
Populated places around the Hauraki Gulf / Tīkapa Moana